Sarungale (The Kite) is a 1979 Sri Lankan Sinhala drama thriller film directed by Sunil Ariyaratne and produced by Y.M. Karunathilake. It stars Gamini Fonseka and Farina Lai in lead roles along with M. Abbas] and Wimal Kumara de Costa. Music composed by Victor Ratnayake. It is the 413th Sri Lankan film in the Sinhala cinema.

The film deals with the inter-ethnic, communal violence between Sinhalese and Tamils. It demonstrate the ambivalence of the Sinhala socio-political establishment towards the Tamil people.

The film won several awards at OCIC film awards ceremony including Best Script. Farina Lai won the Live Talent Award, while Wimal Kumara de Costa and Gamini Fonseka won Special Jury Award at the ceremony. The film also won the Best Actor award and Best Supporting Actress award at 10th Sarasaviya Film Awards held on March 29, 1980, finished fifth with 27978 votes.

Plot

Cast
 Gamini Fonseka as Nadarajah
 Farina Lai as Thangamani
 M. Abbas as Razan
 Wimal Kumara de Costa as Simon
 Veena Jayakody as Susheela
 Sriyani Amarasena as Soma, Simon's wife
 Rinsley Weeraratne as Gal Wathe Sira
 Karunaratne Hangawatte as Gune
 Somasiri Dehipitiya as Susheela's father 'Mr. Jayasekara'
 Shanthi Lekha as Susheela's mother
 Harry Wimalasena as Arresting Police Inspector
 Sisira Kumaratunga as Sira's accomplice
 Richard Weerakody as Sira's accomplice

Songs
The film consists with four songs.

References

External links
 Films, Arts, Music can lay vital roles

1979 films
1970s Sinhala-language films
Films set in Sri Lanka (1948–present)